How About Now is the thirteenth studio album by American singer-songwriter Kenny Loggins.  Released in 2007, its key tracks include "A Love Song" and the title track, "How About Now." As of 2019 it is his most recent album of original material.

Track listing

Personnel
 Kenny Loggins – lead and backing vocals, acoustic guitar, baritone guitar
 Jesse Siebenberg – acoustic guitar, electric guitar, nylon guitar, dobro, lap steel guitar, keyboards, organ, programming, omnichord, bass, drums, percussion, string arrangements, backing vocals
 Tom Bukovac – electric guitar
 Paul Cartwright – mandolin, fiddle, violin, string arrangements
 Todd Hannigan – guitar 
 Jeff King – electric guitar 
 B. James Lowry – acoustic guitar 
 Randy Kohrs – dobro 
 Richard Marx – acoustic guitar, backing vocals
 Miles Mosley – contrabass guitar
 William Owsley III – electric guitar
 Jeff Pevar –  electric guitar, acoustic guitar 
 Gabe Dixon – acoustic piano
 Charles Judge – keyboards
 Jimmy Nichols – keyboards, acoustic piano, strings, string arrangements, arrangements
 Mike Reid – acoustic piano
 Spady Brannan – bass
 Mark Hill – bass
 Dave Marotta – bass
 Craig Young – bass
 Steve Brewster – drums
 Steve DiStanislao – drums
 Dan Needham – drums, percussion 
 Lenny Castro – percussion
 Tom Ball – harmonica
 Jonathan Yudkin – strings
 Marc Mann – string arrangements 
 Gary Burr – backing vocals
 Chip Davis – backing vocals
 Crosby Loggins – backing vocals
 Lois Mahalia – backing vocals
 Rachel Proctor – backing vocals
Choir
 Robert Bailey
 Kendra Carr
 Shateria Dayoe
 Vicki Hampton
 Nashville Gospel Choir
 Shandra Penix
 Grisanthia Stencil
 Kevin Stencil
 Fred Vaughn
Strings
 Vanessa Freebairn-Smith – cello
 James Freebarin-Smith – cello
 Tom Lea – viola
 Neel Hammond – violin
 Joel Pargman – violin

Production
 Producers – Kenny Loggins (Tracks 1-12); Jesse Siebenberg (Tracks 1, 2, 4 & 6); Richard Marx (Track 3); Frank Meyers (Track 5); Peter Collins (Track 7): Gary Burr (Track 12).
 Executive Producer – Jim Brandmeiser
 Production Coordinator – Becky Scott
 Engineers – Bill Decker, James Gantt, Todd Hannigan, Jason Mariani, Chip Matthews, Mike Paragone, Sang Park, Justina Powell, Matt Prock, Bill Schnee, WillIam Sender, Trina Shoemaker and Heather Sturm.
 Assistant Engineer – Adam Beard
 Mixing – David Cole, Jason Mariani, Chip Matthews, Bill Schnee and Trina Shoemaker.
 Editing – Todd Hannigan and Justina Powell
 Mastered by Doug Sax at The Mastering Lab (Ojai, CA).
 Art Direction and Design – Jeff Lancaster
 Cover Photo – Wynn Miller 
 Sleeve Photography – Wynn Miller and Carl Studna
 Management – Gary Borman, Lisa Battista Giglio, Barbara Rose Granatt and Steve Moir at Borman/Moir Entertainment.

References

2007 albums
Albums produced by Richard Marx
Albums produced by Peter Collins (record producer)
Kenny Loggins albums